Andrea Vaccher (born 21 December 1988) is an Italian former cyclist, who competed professionally for  between 2014 and 2016.

Major results

2010
 2nd Trofeo Città di San Vendemiano
 7th Giro del Casentino
2011
 6th Giro del Medio Brenta
2012
 5th Ruota d'Oro
 6th Trofeo Franco Balestra
2014
 1st Trofeo Edil C
 1st Stage 1a (TTT) Giro del Friuli-Venezia Giulia
 3rd Grand Prix Sarajevo
 7th Giro del Medio Brenta
 9th GP Capodarco
2015
 9th Overall Oberösterreich Rundfahrt

References

External links

Living people
1988 births
Italian male cyclists
People from Conegliano
Cyclists from the Province of Treviso